This is the comprehensive list of junior colleges in Japan that exist today or existed in the past. For the purpose of the list, a junior college is defined to be a two-year or three-year college. The list does not include so-called Daigaku-bu, or junior colleges that are part of four-year colleges.

Current
♀Aichi Bunkyo Women's College, Inazawa, Aichi
Aichi Kiwami College of Nursing, Ichinomiya, Aichi
Aichi Konan College, Konan, Aichi
Aikoku Gakuen Junior College, Edogawa, Tokyo
Aino University, Ibaraki, Osaka
Akikusa Gakuen Junior College, Tokorozawa, Saitama
Akita Municipal Junior College of Arts and Crafts, Akita, Akita
Aomori Akenohoshi Junior College, Aomori, Aomori
Aomori Chuo Junior College, Aomori, Aomori
♀Aoyama Gakuin Women's Junior College, Shibuya, Tokyo
Ashikaga Junior College, Ashikaga, Tochigi
Ashiya College, Ashiya, Hyogo
Beppu Mizobe Gakuen College, Beppu, Oita
Bunkyo Gakuin College, Bunkyo, Tokyo
♀Caritas Junior College, Yokohama, Kanagawa
Chiba College of Health Science, Chiba, Chiba
Chiba Keiai Junior College, Sakura, Chiba
Chiba Meitoku College, Chiba, Chiba
Chukyo Junior College, Mizunami, Gifu
College of Industrial Technology, Amagasaki, Hyogo
Daiichi Junior College for Kindergarten Teachers, Dazaifu, Fukuoka
Daiichi Junior College of Infant Education, Kirishima, Kagoshima
♀Ehime Women's College, Uwajima, Ehime
Fujita Health University College, Toyoake, Aichi
Fukuoka College of Health Sciences, Fukuoka, Fukuoka
♀Fukuoka Women's Junior College, Dazaifu, Fukuoka
♀Fukuyama City Junior College for Women, Fukuyama, Hiroshima
♀Gifu City Women's College, Gifu, Gifu
Gifu Junior College Of Health Science, Gifu, Gifu
Gunma Shorei Junior College of Welfare, Ota, Gunma
Hachinohe Junior College, Hachinohe, Aomori
Hakodate Otani College, Hakodate, Hokkaido
♀Hakuho Women's College, Ōji, Nara
Higashi Chikushi Junior College, Kitakyushu, Fukuoka
Higashikyushu Junior College, Nakatsu, Oita
Hirosaki Welfare Junior College, Hirosaki, Aomori
Hiroshima Bunka Two-Year College, Hiroshima, Hiroshima
♀Hokkaido Musashi Women's Junior College
Honan College, Tatsuno, Nagano
Hosen Gakuen College, Nakano, Tokyo
♀Ibaraki Women's Junior college, Naka, Ibaraki
♀Ichinomiya Women's Junior College, Ichinomiya, Aichi
♀Iida Women's Junior College, Iida, Nagano
Ikenobo College, Kyoto, Kyoto
♀IKUEI Junior College, Takasaki, Gunma
Imabari Meitoku Junior College, Imabari
Iwaki Junior College, Iwaki, Fukushima
Iwakuni Junior College, Iwakuni, Yamaguchi
Iwate College of Nursing, Takizawa, Iwate
Izumi Junior College, Sagamihara, Kanagawa
Japan Christian Junior College, Chiba, Chiba
♀Jin-ai Women's College, Fukui, Fukui
♀Jissen Women's Junior College, Hino, Tokyo
Josai University, Sakado, Saitama
Junshin Junior College, Fukuoka, Fukuoka
Kacho College, Kyoto, Kyoto
Kagawa Junior College, Utazu, Kagawa
♀Kagoshima Women's Junior College, Kagoshima, Kagoshima
Kagoshima Prefectural College, Kagoshima, Kagoshima
Kanagawa Prefectural College of Foreign Studies, Yokohama, Kanagawa
Kanazawa Gakuin College, Kanazawa, Ishikawa
♀Kansai Women's College, Kashiwara, Osaka
Kanto Junior College, Tatebayashi, Gunma
Kawaguchi Junior College, Kawaguchi, Saitama
Kawasaki City College of Nursing, Kawasaki, Kanagawa
Kawasaki College of Allied Health Professions, Kurashiki, Okayama
Kibi International University Junior College, Takahashi, Okayama
♀Kobe Women's Junior College, Kobe, Hyogo
Kobe Yamate College, Kobe, Hyogo
Kochi Gakuen College, Kōchi, Kōchi
♀Koen Gakuen Women's Junior College, Sapporo, Hokkaido
Kokugakuin Junior College, Takikawa, Hokkaido
Kokugakuin Tochigi Junior College, Tochigi, Tochigi
Kokusai Gakuin Saitama Junior College, Saitama, Saitama
Kokusai Junior College, Nakano, Tokyo
Komatsu College, Komatsu, Ishikawa
♀Komazawa Women's Junior College, Inagi, Tokyo
♀Koran Women's Junior College, Fukuoka, Fukuoka
Koshien Junior College, Nishinomiya, Hyogo
Kurashiki City College, Kurashiki, Okayama
♀Kurume SHIN-AI Women's College, Kurume, Fukuoka
Kushiro Junior College, Kushiro, Hokkaido
Kyoei Gakuen Junior College, Kasukabe, Saitama
♀Kyoritsu Women's Junior College, Chiyoda, Tokyo
Kyoto Bunkyo Junior College, Uji, Kyoto
Kyoto College of Economics, Kyoto, Kyoto
Kyoto College of Medical Technology, Sonobe, Kyoto
Kyoto Junior College, Fukuchiyama, Kyoto
Kyoto Municipal Junior College of Nursing, Kyoto, Kyoto
Kyoto Seizan College, Nagaokakyo, Kyoto
Kyushu Ryukoku Junior College, Tosu, Saga
♀Kyushu Women's Junior College, Kitakyushu, Fukuoka
Kyushu Zokei Art College, Fukuoka, Fukuoka
Kyushu Otani Junior College, Chikugo, Fukuoka
Matsumoto Junior College, Matsumoto, Nagano
Matsuyama Shinonome Junior College, Matsuyama, Ehime
Meirin College, Niigata, Niigata
Meiwa Gakuen Junior College, Maebashi, Gunma
Minami Kyushu Junior College, Miyazaki, Miyazaki
Minatogawa College, Sanda, Hyogo
Misono Gakuen Junior College, Akita, Akita
Mito Junior College, Mito, Ibaraki
Miyagi Seishin Junior College, Furukawa, Miyagi
Miyazaki Gakuen Junior College, Kiyotake, Miyazaki
Musashigaoka College, Yoshimi, Saitama
♀Musashino Junior College, Sayama, Saitama
NAGASAKI GYOKUSEI Junior College, Nagasaki, Nagasaki
♀Narabunka Women's College, Yamatotakada, Nara
Nagano College of Economics, Nagano, Nagano
♀Nagano Women's Junior College, Nagano, Nagano
Nagasaki College of Foreign Languages, Nagasaki, Nagasaki
Nagasaki Junior College, Sasebo, Nagasaki
♀Nagasaki Women's Junior College, Nagasaki, Nagasaki
Nagoya College, Toyoake, Aichi
Nagoya Management Junior College, Owariasahi, Aichi
Nagoya Ryūjō Junior College, Nagoya, Aichi
Nakakyushu Junior College, Yatsushiro, Kumamoto
Nakanihon Automotive College, Sakahogi, Gifu
Nanzan Junior College, Nagoya, Aichi
Nara College of Art, Kashihara, Nara
Nara Saho College, Nara, Nara
Nayoro City College, Nayoro, Hokkaido
Newton College
Niigata Chuoh Junior College, Kamo, Niigata
Niigata College of Technology, Niigata, Niigata
♀Niigata Woman's College, Niigata, Niigata
Niijima Gakuen Junior College, Takasaki, Gunma
Niimi College, Niimi, Okayama
Nishi-nippon Junior College, Fukuoka, Fukuoka
Obihiro Otani Junior College, Otofuke, Hokkaido
♀Odawara Women's Junior College, Odawara, Kanagawa
♀Ogaki Women's College, Ogaki, Gifu
Oita Junior College, Oita, Oita
Oita Prefectural College of Arts and Culture, Oita, Oita
Okayama College, Kurashiki, Okayama
♀Okazaki Women's Junior College, Okazaki, Aichi
Okinawa Christian Junior College, Nishihara, Okinawa
Okinawa Women's Junior College, Naha, Okinawa
Orio Aishin Junior College, Kitakyushu, Fukuoka
Osaka Aoyama Junior College, Minoh, Osaka
Osaka Chiyoda Junior College, Kawachinagano, Osaka
Osaka Christian College, Osaka, Osaka
Osaka Gakuin Junior College, Suita, Osaka
♀Osaka Jonan Women's Junior College, Osaka, Osaka
♀Osaka Jogakuin College, Osaka, Osaka
Osaka Junior College of Social Health and Welfare, Sakai, Osaka
♀Osaka Kun-ei Women's College, Settsu, Osaka
Osaka Ohtani College, Tondabayashi, Osaka
Osaka Seikei College, Osaka, Osaka
♀Osaka Shin-Ai College, Osaka, Osaka
♀Osaka Women's Junior College, Fujiidera, Osaka
Osaka Yuhigaoka Gakuen Junior College, Osaka, Osaka
Otemae College, Itami, Hyogo
SANNO COLLEGE, Jiyugaoka, Setagaya, Tokyo
Shinshu Junior College, Saku, Nagano
Saga Junior College, Saga, Saga
♀Saga Women's Junior College, Saga, Saga
♀Saitama Junshin Junior College, Hanyū, Saitama
♀Saitama Women's Junior College, Hidaka, Saitama
♀Sakai Women's Junior College, Sakai, Osaka
♀Sakura no Seibo Junior College, Fukushima, Fukushima
Sano College, Sano, Tochigi
Sanyo Gakuen College, Okayama, Okayama
♀Sanyo Women's College, Hatsukaichi, Hiroshima
Seibi Gakuen College, Kita, Tokyo
♀Seibo Jogakuin Junior College, Kyoto, Kyoto
♀Seika Women's Junior College, Fukuoka, Fukuoka
♀Seirei Women's Junior College, Akita, Akita
♀Seiryo Women's Junior College, Kanazawa, Ishikawa
♀Seisen Jogakuin College, Nagano, Nagano
Seishin Ursula Gakuen Mission Junior College, Nobeoka, Miyazaki
Seiwa Gakuen College, Sendai, Miyagi
Senzoku Gakuen Junior College, Kawasaki, Kanagawa
Setouchi Junior College, Takase, Kagawa
Shiga Bunkyo Junior College, Nagahama, Shiga
Shiga Junior College, Otsu, Shiga
Shimonoseki Junior College, Shimonoseki, Yamaguchi
Shiraume Gakuen Junior College, Kodaira, Tokyo
Shoei Junior College, Kobe, Hyogo
Shogen Junior College, Minokamo, Gifu
♀Shoinhigashi Women's Junior College, Higashiosaka, Osaka
Shohoku College, Atsugi, Kanagawa
Shonan Junior College, Yokosuka, Kanagawa
Showagakuin Junior College, Ichikawa, Chiba
Shuko Junior College, Ichinoseki, Iwate
Shukugawa Gakuin College, Nishinomiya, Hyogo
Shukutoku Junior College, Itabashi, Tokyo
♀Soka Women's College, Hachiōji, Tokyo
♀St. Cecilia Women's Junior College, Yamato, Kanagawa
St. Margaret's Junior College, Suginami, Tokyo
♀Suzugamine Women's College, Hiroshima, Hiroshima
Suzuka Junior College, Suzuka, Mie
Takada Junior College, Tsu, Mie
Takamatsu Junior College, Takamatsu, Kagawa
Takayama College of Car Technology, Takayama, Gifu
Teikyo Heisei Nursing Junior College, Ichihara, Chiba
Teikyo Junior College, Shibuya, Tokyo
Teikyougakuen Junior College, Hokuto, Yamanashi
The Nippon Dental University College at Niigata, Niigata, Niigata
The Nippon Dental University College at Tokyo, Chiyoda, Tokyo
Toho Gakuen College of Drama and Music, Chofu, Tokyo
♀Tohoku Women's Junior College, Hirosaki, Aomori
♀Toita Women's College, Minato, Tokyo
Tokai University Junior College of Nursing and Medical Technology, Hiratsuka, Kanagawa
Tokiwa Junior College, Mito, Ibaraki
Tokiwakai College, Osaka, Osaka
Tokoha Gakuen Junior College, Shizuoka, Shizuoka
Tokushima College of Technology, Itano, Tokushima
Tokyo Bunka Junior College, Nakano, Tokyo
Tokyo College of Transport Studies, Toshima, Tokyo
♀Tokyo Kasei-Gakuin Junior College, Chiyoda, Tokyo
Tokyo Management College, Chiba, Chiba
Tokyo Rissho Junior College, Suginami, Tokyo
Tokyo Seitoku College, Kita, Tokyo
♀Tokyo Women's Junior College of Physical Education, Kunitachi, Tokyo
Tottori College, Kurayoshi, Tottori
Toyama College of Welfare Science, Kosugi, Toyama
Toyama College, Toyama, Toyama
Toyo College of Food Technology, Kawanishi, Hyogo
♀Toyoko Gakuen Women's College, Setagaya, Tokyo
Tsukuba International Junior College, Tsuchiura, Ibaraki
Tsuruga College, Tsuruga, Fukui
Tsurukawa Jr. College, Machida, Tokyo
♀Ueda Women's Junior College, Ueda, Nagano
Uekusa Gakuen Junior College, Chiba, Chiba
Utsunomiya BUNSEI Junior College, Utsunomiya, Tochigi
Utsunomiya Junior College, Utsunomiya, Tochigi
Uyo Gakuen College, Tendo, Yamagata
♀Wakayama Shin-Ai Women's Junior College, Wakayama, Wakayama
Yamagata Junior College, Yamagata, Yamagata
Yamaguchi College of Arts, Yamaguchi, Yamaguchi
Yamaguchi Junior College, Hofu, Yamaguchi
Yamamura Gakuen College, Hatoyama, Saitama
Yamano College of Aesthetics, Hachioji, Tokyo
Yamawaki Gakuen Junior College, Minato, Tokyo
Yamazaki College of Animal Health Technology, Hachioji, Tokyo
Yokohama College of Art and Design, Yokohama, Kanagawa
Yokohama Soei Junior College, Yokohama, Kanagawa
♀Yokohama Women's Junior College, Yokohama, Kanagawa
♀Yonezawa Women's Junior College, Yonezawa, Yamagata
♀ indicates a women's college

Historical
Allen International Junior College
♀Kanto Gakuin Women's Junior College, Yokohama, Kanagawa
Himeji College of Hyogo
Fujimigaoka Women's Junior College, Mishima, Shizuoka
♀ indicates a women's college

See also 
 Higher education in Japan
 List of universities in Japan
 List of current and historical women's universities and colleges in Japan

References 

 (partially outdated)

Junior